Kildonan, Zimbabwe is a village in Mashonaland West Province in Zimbabwe.

Populated places in Mashonaland West Province